Phengaris is a genus of gossamer-winged butterflies in the subfamily Polyommatinae. Commonly, these butterflies are called large blues, which if referring to a particular species is P. arion, a species resident in Europe and some parts of Asia.

Phengaris is currently defined to include the genus Maculinea. The type species of the latter was the Alcon blue ("M." alcon). This species was found to be less closely related to most other supposed members of Maculinea than the traditional Phengaris species, and hence the two genera were merged to form a monophyletic group. Alternatively, Maculinea could be restricted to the one or two species of "Alcon" blues, and the rest of it be separated as a new genus. But this would create two very small genera, which is generally avoided by modern taxonomists. As Phengaris is the older name, it thus replaces Maculinea.

Maculinea was alternatively considered to be a subgenus of Glaucopsyche. But while Glaucopsyche and Phengaris (including Maculinea) are certainly close relatives, they are unlikely to be that close.

The most recently discovered species in the genus is P. xiushani, first reported in 2010 and found in undisturbed forested mountains, unlike all the other members which live in grasslands over their entire range of distribution.

Species
The species, listed in the presumed phylogenetic sequence from the most ancestral to the most apomorphic, are: 

Basal group (Maculinea sensu stricto)
 Phengaris alcon – Alcon blue, Alcon large blue
 †Phengaris alcon arenaria – Dutch Alcon blue
 Phengaris rebeli – mountain Alcon blue (may belong in P. alcon)

Phengaris sensu stricto
 Phengaris daitozana (Wileman, 1908)
 Phengaris albida (Leech, 1893)
 Phengaris atroguttata – great spotted blue
 Phengaris xiushani Wang & Settele, 2010 – Xiushan's large blue

Other "Maculinea"
 Phengaris kurentzovi (Sibatani, Saigusa & Hirowatari, 1994)
 Phengaris kurentzovi kurentzovi northern China and Korea
 Phengaris kurentzovi daurica Dubatolov, 1999 Transbaikalia
 Phengaris nausithous – dusky large blue
 Phengaris ogumae (Matsumura, 1910) (tentatively placed here)
 Phengaris ogumae ogumae Japan 
 Phengaris ogumae doii (Matsumura, 1928) Kuriles
 Phengaris teleius – scarce large blue
 Phengaris cyanecula (Eversmann, 1848)
 Phengaris cyanecula cyanecula Mongolia
 Phengaris cyanecula obscurior (Staudinger, 1901) Tian-Shan
 Phengaris cyanecula taras (Fruhstorfer, 1915) Alay Mountains
 Phengaris cyanecula ussuriensis (Sheljuzhko, 1928) Amur Oblast, Ussuri
 Phengaris arion – large blue
 Phengaris ligurica (Wagner, 1904) (may belong in P. arion)
 Phengaris takamukui
 Phengaris arionides – greater large blue

Incertae sedis
 Phengaris xiaheana (Murayama, 1919)

Footnotes

References

  (2008): Tree of Life Web Project – Phengaris. Version of 2008-JAN-06. Retrieved 2009-OCT-04.
  (2006): Markku Savela's Lepidoptera and some other life forms – Phengaris. Version of 2006-MAR-12. Retrieved 2009-OCT-04.
  (2008): Markku Savela's Lepidoptera and some other life forms – Maculinea. Version of 2008-JUL-05. Retrieved 2009-OCT-04.

External links
Images representing Phengaris  at Consortium for the Barcode of Life

 
Lycaenidae genera
Taxa named by William Doherty